James Dewitt Primus (born May 18, 1964) is a former American football running back in the National Football League who played for the Atlanta Falcons. He played college football for the UCLA Bruins.

References

1964 births
Living people
American football running backs
Atlanta Falcons players
UCLA Bruins football players